My Name Is Skrillex is the debut EP by American electronic music producer Skrillex. The EP was self-released for free on Skrillex's Myspace page on June 7, 2010. 
The link can now be found on his Facebook page. It is also available for free download on SoundCloud. It is Moore's first release to feature the stage name Skrillex.

Track listing

Reception
In a 2018 review of the EP, Kat Bein of Billboard called the My Name Is Skrillex a "timeless classic". Your EDM named the EP "one of [dance] culture’s most important". EDM.com called the EP "one of the most influential EDM albums of all time".

References

2010 debut EPs
Dubstep EPs
Skrillex albums